The Eagles also known as Team Eagles (Skuadra Shqiponjat) is a quick intervention unit of the Albanian State Police. They are the most specialized quick intervention unit after RENEA (Department of Neutralization of Armed Elements, Albanian: Reparti i Neutralizimit të Elementit të Armatosur) and FNSH (Rapid Intervention Force (Albania), Albanian: Forcat e Ndërhyrjes se Shpejtë).
The Eagles were created in 2006 by the idea and the direct support of Mrs. Muhamet Rrumbullaku (Police Director of Tirana at the time) disbanded in 2013 but were quickly reinstated in 2014.

See also
Albanian Police
RENEA

References

Law enforcement in Albania